Control may refer to:

Basic meanings

Economics and business
 Control (management), an element of management
 Control, an element of management accounting
 Comptroller (or controller), a senior financial officer in an organization
 Controlling interest, a percentage of voting stock shares sufficient to prevent opposition
 Foreign exchange controls, regulations on trade
 Internal control, a process to help achieve specific goals typically related to managing risk

Mathematics and science
 Control (optimal control theory), a variable for steering a controllable system of state variables toward a desired goal
 Controlling for a variable in statistics
 Scientific control, an experiment in which "confounding variables" are minimised to reduce error
 Control variables, variables which are kept constant during an experiment
 Biological pest control, a natural method of controlling pests
 Control network in geodesy and surveying, a set of reference points of known geospatial coordinates
 Control room, a room where a physical facility can be monitored
 Process control in continuous production processes
 Security controls, safeguards against security risks

Medicine
 Control, according to the ICD-10-PCS, in the Medical and Surgical Section (0), is the root operation (# 3) that means stopping, or attempting to stop, post-procedural bleeding
 Chlordiazepoxide, also sold under the trade name Control
 Lorazepam, sold under the trade name Control

Systems engineering, computing and technology
 Automatic control, the application of control theory for regulation of processes without direct intervention
 Control character, or non-printing character, in a character set; does not represent a written symbol, but is used to control the interpretation or display of text
 Unicode control characters, characters with no visual or spatial representation
 Control engineering, a discipline of modeling and controlling of systems
 Control system, the ability to control some mechanical or chemical equipment
 Control theory, the mathematical theory about controlling dynamical systems over time
 Control flow, means of specifying the sequence of operations in computer programs
 Control variables in programming, which regulate the flow of control
 Control key, on a computer keyboard
 GUI widget (control or widget), a component of a graphical user interface
 Input device (control), a physical user interface to a computer system

Society, psychology and sociology
 Control (psychology)
 Locus of control, an extent to which individuals believe that they can control events that affect them
 Self-control, the ability to control one's emotions and desires
 Power (social and political), the ability to control others
 Social control, mechanisms that regulate social behavior
 Abusive power and control
 Control freak, a person who attempts to dictate
 Mind control, the use of manipulative methods to persuade others
 Civilian control of the military

Other basic uses
 Control point (orienteering), a marked waypoint in orienteering and related sports
 Control (linguistics), a relation between elements of two clauses

Geography
 Control, Alberta

Books
 Control (novel), a 1982 novel by William Goldman
 Control (fictional character), in the 1974 British spy novel Tinker, Tailor, Soldier, Spy

Film and TV

Films
 Control (2004 film), starring Ray Liotta, Willem Dafoe and Michelle Rodriguez
 Control (2007 film), a film about Joy Division singer Ian Curtis, directed by Anton Corbijn
 Control (2013 film), a Chinese–Hong Kong film written and directed by Kenneth Bi
 Kontroll, a 2003 Hungarian film, released as Control internationally
 Control, a UK comedy short by Frank Miller

TV
 Control (House), a 2005 episode of the television series House
 Control, a Spanish-language series aired on Univision
 Control, a recurring character in the sketch programme A Bit of Fry & Laurie
 Control, a character on the science fiction crime drama Person of Interest
 [C] - The Money of Soul And Possibility Control, or [C] - Control, a 2011 anime
 Ctrl (web series), an American comedy web series
 CONTROL (Get Smart), a fictional counter-espionage agency

Games
 Control and control-bid, features of the game contract bridge
 Control (video game), a 2019 video game by Remedy Entertainment

Music
 Control (Starlight Express), a character from the rock musical

Albums
 Control (GoodBooks album), 2007
 Control (Janet Jackson album), 1986
 Control (Pedro the Lion album), 2002
 Control, a 2011 album by Abandon
 Control, a 2014 album by The Brew
 Control, a 1981 album by Conrad Schnitzler
 Control, a 2013 EP by Disclosure
 Control, a 1994 album by Hellnation
 Control, a 2012 EP by The Indecent
 Control, a 1971 album by John St Field
 Control, a 2012 album by Uppermost
 Control, a 2003 album by Where Fear and Weapons Meet
 Ctrl (SZA album), 2017

Songs
 "Control" (Big Sean song), 2013
 "Control" (Garbage song), 2012
 "Control" (Janet Jackson song), 1986
 "Control" (Kid Sister song), 2007
 "Control" (Matrix & Futurebound song), 2013
 "Control" (Metro Station song), 2007
 "Control" (Mutemath song), 2004
 "Control" (Poe song), 1998
 "Control" (Puddle of Mudd song), 2001
 "Control" (Traci Lords song), 1994
 "Control" (Zoe Wees song), 2020
 "Control", by Basement from Colourmeinkindness, 2012
 "Control", by the Black Dahlia Murder from Everblack, 2013
 "Control", by Delta Goodrem from Child of the Universe, 2012
 "Control", by Disclosure from The Face, 2012
 "Control", by División Minúscula, 2008
 "Control", by Doja Cat from Purrr!, 2014
 "Control", by Earshot from Two, 2004
 "Control", by Feder, 2018
 "Control", by Halsey from Badlands, 2015
 "Control", by London Grammar from Truth Is a Beautiful Thing, 2017
 "Control", by Poe from Haunted, 2000
 "Control", by Stabbing Westward from Ungod, 1994
 "Control", by Wisin from El Regreso del Sobreviviente, 2014
 "Control (Somehow You Want Me)", by Tenth Avenue North from Followers, 2016

See also
 Action (disambiguation)
 Control point (disambiguation)
 Control unit (disambiguation)
 control(human, data, sound), a 2014 performance piece by Bob van Luijt
 Controller (disambiguation)
 Damage control (disambiguation)
 Uncontrolled (disambiguation)